Alaa Motar (born 22 November 1980) is an Iraqi hurdler. He competed in the men's 400 metres hurdles at the 2004 Summer Olympics.

References

1980 births
Living people
Athletes (track and field) at the 2004 Summer Olympics
Iraqi male hurdlers
Olympic athletes of Iraq
Place of birth missing (living people)